This article lists important figures and events in the public affairs of British Malaya during the year 1944, together with births and deaths of prominent Malayans. Japanese forces continued to occupy Malaya.

Events 
Below, the events of World War II have the "WW2" acronym.
 11 January – WW2: Action of 11 January 1944
 17 July – WW2: Action of 17 July 1944

Births
 15 January – Syed Hamid Albar – Politician
 27 January – Adenan Satem – 5th Chief Minister of Sarawak (died 2017)
 4 February – Punch Gunalan – Badminton player (died 2012)
 20 February – Abdul Hamid Zainal Abidin – Politician
 6 June – Abdul Rahim bin Mohd. Noor – 5th Inspector General of Police
 27 July – Abdul Hamid Pawanteh – Politician
 12 August – Rustam A. Sani – University Malaya lecturer (died 2008)
 22 August – Syed Razak Bin Syed Zain Barakhbah – Politician and former Menteri Besar of Kedah (1999-2005)
 7 December – Mustafa Ali – Politician
 Unknown date – Fazidah Joned – Singer (died 2001)
 Unknown date – Joseph Kurup – Politician
 Unknown date – Zami Ismail – Actor (died 2011)

See also
 1944 
 1943 in Malaya | 1945 in Malaya
 History of Malaysia

References

1940s in Malaya
Malaya